Dagen's Grocery, also or formerly known as Ole B. Johnson and Sons Hotel and Store, in Jud, North Dakota, is listed on the National Register of Historic Places.  It was built in 1905 and includes Early Commercial architecture.  It has served as a post office, as a department store, and as a hotel.  The listing included two contributing buildings.

References

Commercial buildings on the National Register of Historic Places in North Dakota
Buildings designated early commercial in the National Register of Historic Places
Commercial buildings completed in 1905
Grocery store buildings
National Register of Historic Places in LaMoure County, North Dakota
Retail buildings in North Dakota
1905 establishments in North Dakota